Richard Louis Pierre Allemane (19 January 1882 – 24 May 1956) was a French football defender. He was born in Montpellier and died in Autreville, Aisne.

Allemane played for Passy (before 1900), Club Français (1900–1902), Racing Club de France (1902–1909) and CASG Paris (1909–1914). He won the national tournament in 1907 with RC Paris and placed second in 1900 with Club Français, in 1902, 1903 and 1908 with Racing.

For the France national football team, he got seven international caps from 1905 to 1908. He won a silver medal for soccer in the 1900 Summer Olympics.

References

External links

Profile on French federation official site

1882 births
1956 deaths
Footballers from Montpellier
French footballers
France international footballers
Association football defenders
Olympic footballers of France
Olympic silver medalists for France
Footballers at the 1900 Summer Olympics
Racing Club de France Football players
Club Français players
Olympic medalists in football
Medalists at the 1900 Summer Olympics